Yorique Antheunis (born 26 June 1991) is a professional football defender. He last played for Sporting Hasselt.

Prior to Bocholt, Antheunis played with Sint-Truiden, first achieving promotion from the Belgian Second Division in 2009, then three seasons in the Belgian Pro League.

References

External links
 
 

Belgian footballers
1991 births
Living people
Sint-Truidense V.V. players
Belgian Pro League players
Challenger Pro League players
Association football defenders